Holes, released in 2004, is the first album by indie pop band melpo mene, produced by Imperial Recordings.

Track listing

 "I Should Get Away" - 3:14
 "Holes" - 2:37
 "Hello Benjamin" - 4:37
 "Good With the Mothers" - 3:09
 "To Be Someone" - 3:10
 "Lady" - 3:36
 "Dream About Me" - 3:02
 "Wait Up" - 2:43
 "Tropical Island" - 4:14
 "Don't Save Me" - 4:14

2004 albums
Melpo Mene albums